Thomas Esmonde may refer to:

 Thomas Esmonde (VC) (1829–1872), Irish recipient of the Victoria Cross
 Sir Thomas Esmonde, 1st Baronet (died c. 1665), of the Esmonde baronets
Sir Thomas Esmonde, 8th Baronet (died 1803), of the Esmonde baronets
Sir Thomas Esmonde, 9th Baronet (1786–1868), MP for Wexford Borough
Sir Thomas Esmonde, 11th Baronet (1862–1935), Irish MP and Senator
 Sir Thomas Francis Grattan Esmonde, 17th Baronet (born 1960), of the Esmonde baronets